cAMP-dependent protein kinase type I-alpha regulatory subunit is an enzyme that in humans is encoded by the PRKAR1A gene.

Function 

cAMP is a signaling molecule important for a variety of cellular functions. cAMP exerts its effects by activating the cAMP-dependent protein kinase A (PKA), which transduces the signal through phosphorylation of different target proteins. The inactive holoenzyme of PKA is a tetramer composed of two regulatory and two catalytic subunits. cAMP causes the dissociation of the inactive holoenzyme into a dimer of regulatory subunits bound to four cAMP and two free monomeric catalytic subunits. Four different regulatory subunits and three catalytic subunits of PKA have been identified in humans. The protein encoded by this gene is one of the regulatory subunits. This protein was found to be a tissue-specific extinguisher that down-regulates the expression of seven liver genes in hepatoma x fibroblast hybrids Three alternatively spliced transcript variants encoding the same protein have been observed.

Clinical significance 

Functional null mutations in this gene cause Carney complex (CNC), an autosomal dominant multiple neoplasia syndrome. This gene can fuse to the RET protooncogene by gene rearrangement and form the thyroid tumor-specific chimeric oncogene known as PTC2.

Mutation of PRKAR1A leads to the Carney complex, associating multiple endocrine tumors.

Interactions 

PRKAR1A has been shown to interact with:

 AKAP10, 
 AKAP1, 
 AKAP4, 
 ARFGEF1, 
 ARFGEF2, 
 Grb2, 
 MYO7A,
 PRKAR1B,  and
 UBE2M.

See also 
cAMP-dependent protein kinase

References

Further reading

External links 
 PDBe-KB provides an overview of all the structure information available in the PDB for Human cAMP-dependent protein kinase type I-alpha regulatory subunit (PRKAR1A)

Signal transduction